Leopold (Leo) Henrik Stanislaus Mechelin (24 November 1839 in Hamina, Finland – 26 January 1914 in Helsinki, Finland) was a Finnish politician, professor, liberal reformer and businessman.  A leading defender of the autonomy of the Grand Duchy of Finland, and of the rights of women and minorities, Mechelin's 1905–1908 government
("Mechelin's Senate") made Finland the first nation in the world with the universal right to vote and to be elected. During his period in office the freedom of expression, the press, and of assembly were introduced.

Career
He also founded the Liberal Party of Finland (1880–1885), wrote its program, was one of the founders of the Union Bank of Finland 1862 (now part of Nordea Bank) and co-founded the Nokia Company (1871) with Fredrik Idestam, was the first chairman of the town council of Helsinki (1875–1876 and 1892–1899) and an internationally respected expert on politology and member of peace movement. Emperor Alexander II ennobled Mechelin 1876.

Mechelin led the passive resistance in Finland during the first period of oppression (1899–1905) until and even after his banishment (1903), from which officials had to let him return as a member of parliament (House of Nobles) 1904, welcomed by a celebrating crowd of 10,000 people. In a secret meeting of the Kagaali, Mechelin had written a petition against the draft of Finns to the Russian army, which collected almost 500,000 signatures. His coalition, the Constitutionals, managed to end the draft through boycott.

Biography

Born in Hamina in 1839, the son of Gustaf Johan Mechelin and Amanda Gustava Costiander, Leo Mechelin studied at the University of Helsinki, gaining his bachelor's and master's degrees in philosophy in 1860, a bachelor's degree in law in 1864, and a license and doctorate in 1873.

As professor of jurisdiction and politology 1874–82, Mechelin had argued that the tsars were bound by the old constitutional laws from the time of the Swedish rule of Finland (before 1809), and hence affirmed that Finland was a separate, constitutional state, which the tsar could only rule by law, whereas in Russia he had absolute power. During the periods of oppression, the tsar tried to impose unconstitutional laws, which Mechelin opposed. The unrests in Russia and Finland (1905) finally compelled the tsar to comply with the November Manifesto written by Mechelin. This allowed Mechelin to form a government (1905–1908) and to transform Finland into what was in many respects the first liberal democracy (e.g., in New Zealand women already had the right to vote but not to be voted; in Australia only white people had those rights) in 1906. In 1907, the first universal elections to the one-chamber parliament ("eduskunta") were held, and 19 of its 200 first members were women. However, the constitutionals of all parties did not obtain the majority of seats, and the tsar realised that he could carry on with the oppression, starting the second period of oppression (1908–1917). After Mechelin's death (in 1914), the two revolutions in Russia allowed  Finland to declare its independence (1917) and Mechelin's younger co-workers were able to complete his work.

Nokia, once a world-leading mobile phone corporation, was founded by Mechelin and his student days' roommate Fredrik Idestam as a forestry company. Later Mechelin's wish to expand into the electricity business was at first thwarted by Idestam's opposition, but Mechelin managed to convince most shareholders of his plans and became the company chairman (1898–1914), thus being able to realise his visions.

Mechelin was also active in civil society and President of the current University of Art and Design Helsinki and of the Finnish Art Society. As a politician he was always highly respected among all parties and citizens, although after the dissolution of the Liberal Party (1885) he never joined any other party. Mechelin demanded peaceful nonviolent resistance and did not bend even during hard times.

Leo Mechelin has received several accolades and honorary dedications following the Russian revolutions and the Finnish Declaration of Independence, including several streets named after him  such as Mechelininkatu in Helsinki and Mechelinintie in Hamina. Finnish sculptor Walter Runeberg made a sculpture of Mechelin's bust for his 70th birthday. Today the statue sits on the steps to the House of the Estates, which is a major governmental building in central Helsinki.

One of his siblings was the opera singer Emilie Mechelin.

References 

 Eduskunta - edustajamatrikkeli 

Specific

Further reading
 
 

1839 births
1914 deaths
People from Hamina
People from Viipuri Province (Grand Duchy of Finland)
Swedish-speaking Finns
19th-century Finnish politicians
Swedish People's Party of Finland politicians
Finnish senators
Members of the Diet of Finland
Members of the Parliament of Finland (1910–11)
Members of the Parliament of Finland (1911–13)
Anti-Russification activists
Grand Duchy of Finland
Nokia people
Finnish political scientists